Brock Radunske (born April 5, 1983) is a Canadian-born South Korean former professional ice hockey forward. He was selected in the third round of the 2002 NHL Entry Draft, 79th overall, by the Edmonton Oilers.

Enrolled as a communications major, in Michigan State University, he spent three seasons playing for the Michigan State Spartans. While at Michigan State he participated in the Cold War, an outdoor game between Michigan State and the University of Michigan.

Radunske became the first North American born player ever to sign with Anyang Halla and tallest forward in club's history. While playing for Anyang Halla, he earned the nickname "Canadian Big Beauty" (Korean: 빙판의 꽃미남) from Korean fans because of his handsome looks. He became eligible to play for the South Korean national team when granted citizenship in 2013, the first player without Korean ancestry to play on the team.

Professional career
He made his professional debut with Edmonton (AHL) on 18 October 2004 vs. San Antonio. He scored his first professional goal on 23 October 2004 at Manitoba.

In 2005–06, he was part of the Greenville team that advanced to an American Conference division semifinal playoff berth with a 45-24-3 regular season record (93 points).

He scored his first goal of the season with Grand Rapids (AHL) on 14 November 2006 vs. Milwaukee. He followed-up three games later with the game's first goal on 1 December 2006 vs. Rochester. He scored his first goal in a Thunder uniform on 4 March 2007, part of a two-goal output. He scored a career-high and tied a Thunder all-time single-game record with four points (1g-3a) on 9 March 2007 vs. Victoria, in a 5–4 shootout win. He broke a Thunder single-game record with a new career-high five points (2g-3a) on 22 March 2007, in a 6–3 win at Utah. He spent the 2007–08' season with Augsburger Panther (DEL), appeared  in 37 games and scoring seven goals and 19 assists, for a total of 26 points.

Career in Asia
In May 2008, Radunske signed a one-year deal with Anyang Halla.

In his first season with Halla, he earned his first point on Brad Fast's goal on 20 September 2008 vs High1 at Ko-yang Rink. He scored his first goal for Halla on 21 September 2008 vs High1 with 51 seconds in the game. Radunske scored his first goal in home building on 29 September 2008 vs Oji Eagles.
Radunske scored his first hat trick as a Halla on 18 January 2009 vs Seibu Prince Rabbits.

After leading the league with goals & points, Radunske was awarded four trophies including regular season MVP, the Best-forward, best scorer & best point. In February 2009 Radunske re-signed with Anyang Halla for a three-year deal. Radunske's three-year deal is the longest contract extension in the club's history including all imports among Korean pro-sports league.

Radunske captured his first ever championship title, beating Nippon Paper Cranes series of 3–2 in the 2009–10 Asia League final. Radunske was named playoffs MVP.

As of the 2013–14 season, he's team all-time leader with most Goals scored and Points accumulated. Radunske officially retired after 2017-2018 season.

International career
In March 2013 Radunske became a Korean citizen and was eligible to play for the South Korean national team. He was named to the team for the 2013 World Championships Division IA tournament. Radunske became the first member of the South Korean national team to not have Korean ancestry. His debut in the Korean national team was a success as he won the Team MVP for the tournament. He also played for Team Korea for 2018 Winter Olympics in Pyeongchang.

Career statistics

Regular season and playoffs

International

Career highlights and awards

Asia League Ice Hockey Awards

2017–18 ALH season:
Asia League Champion
2016–17 ALH season:
Asia League Champion
2015–16 ALH season:
Asia League Champion
2014–15 ALH season:
Asia League 'Best-Forward' of the Year
Asia League Most Assists (56)
2012–13 ALH season:
Asia League Best Six
2010–11 ALH season:
Asia League Champion
2009–10 ALH season:
Asia League Champion
Asia League Playoffs MVP
2008–09 ALH season:
Asia League 'Best-Forward' of the Year
Asia League 'MVP' of the year (Regular Season)
Asia League Most Goals (29)
Asia League Most Points (57)

Records
Anyang Halla

Team all-time leader for Most Points
Team all-time leader for Most Goals
Team all-time leader for Most Assists
First player in team history to score 100 goals
First player in team history to accumulate 300 points
First player in team history to accumulate 400 points

Personal life
Radunske was born in Kitchener, Ontario, but grew up in the town of New Hamburg. Nicknamed "Brocko" since he was a youngster. He is married to his wife, Kelly, with whom he has a daughter and a son.

References

External links

1983 births
HL Anyang players
Augsburger Panther players
Canadian ice hockey left wingers
Edmonton Oilers draft picks
Edmonton Road Runners players
Grand Rapids Griffins players
Greenville Grrrowl players
Ice hockey people from Ontario
Living people
Michigan State Spartans men's ice hockey players
Naturalized citizens of South Korea
South Korean ice hockey left wingers
Canadian expatriate ice hockey players in South Korea
Sportspeople from Kitchener, Ontario
Stockton Thunder players
Olympic ice hockey players of South Korea
Ice hockey players at the 2018 Winter Olympics
Canadian expatriate ice hockey players in Germany
Canadian expatriate ice hockey players in the United States
Canadian expatriate ice hockey players in Switzerland
Canadian emigrants to South Korea